Bleeds is the ninth studio album by English rapper Roots Manuva. It was released on 30 October 2015 on the Big Dada label.

Critical reception
At Metacritic, which assigns a weighted average score out of 100 to reviews from mainstream critics, the album received an average score of 80% based on 17 reviews, indicating "generally favorable reviews".

In a positive review for Exclaim!, Kyle Mullin wrote that "His rhymes are so layered and rapid that they are all but indecipherable, giving them endless rewind value," further stating that "these features make Bleeds a dense, dark, demanding listen. But patient, socially conscious audiences will not only find it compelling, but galvanizing too." Noel Gardner of NME gave the album 4 stars out of 5, writing, "To borrow one of his old album titles, this is awfully deep."

Track listing

Charts

References

External links
 

2015 albums
Roots Manuva albums
Big Dada albums
Albums produced by Fred Again